"The Fear That Walks By Noonday" is a short story by Willa Cather. It was first published in The Sombrero, a yearbook published by the University of Nebraska in 1894.

Plot summary
A team of football players have a talk before a game against the 'Injuns'. In the previous matchup between the two teams, one of the opposing team players was fatally injured.  Once the teams take the field, an unusual coldness comes over the playing field and a number of unexplained events take place.  One player, Fred, passes out. Later, at the post-game dinner, a very morose atmosphere hangs over the proceedings.  The story ends on a very different note when Reggie yells out McKinley's political victory.

Characters
Frederick Hurton
Regiland Harton
Morrison
Chum-Chum, a girl.
The coach
Policemen

Allusions to actual history
William McKinley's re-election as Governor of Ohio in 1893 is mentioned.

Literary significance and criticism
The theme of a football game was suggested to Cather by Dorothy Canfield Fisher.
It has been described as 'a highly conventional ghost story'.

References

External links
Full Text at the Willa Cather Archive

1894 short stories
Short stories by Willa Cather